

Films

References

Films
2015
2015-related lists